Worley is an unincorporated community in Monongalia County, West Virginia, United States. At one time, it was home to the Andy Post Office. Andy later became named Worley.

Worley most likely was named after the mother's maiden name of an early settler.

References 

Unincorporated communities in West Virginia
Unincorporated communities in Monongalia County, West Virginia